Makoni Central is a constituency of the National Assembly of the Parliament of Zimbabwe, located in Manicaland Province. Its current MP since the 2018 election is David Tekeshe of the Movement for Democratic Change Alliance.

Electoral history 
Makoni Central was a newly-created constituency in the March 2008 parliamentary election. 

Justice Minister Patrick Chinamasa was the ZANU-PF candidate for the seat in the 2008 election. He lost to the Movement for Democratic Change (MDC) candidate John Nyamande. Dunmore Kusano, an Independent candidate, came third.

References

https://web.archive.org/web/20080303001109/http://www.newzimbabwe.com/pages/electoral159.17766.html
http://www.timesonline.co.uk/tol/news/world/africa/article3650700.ece
https://web.archive.org/web/20080401165135/http://www.talkzimbabwe.com/news/130/ARTICLE/2020/2008-03-31.html
http://www.thezimbabwean.co.uk/index.php?option=com_content&view=article&id=11860:election-updates&catid=31:top%20zimbabwe%20stories&Itemid=66

2008 establishments in Zimbabwe
Constituencies established in 2008
Makoni District
Manicaland Province
Parliamentary constituencies in Zimbabwe